Echthrus niger is a species of ichneumon wasp in the family Ichneumonidae.

References

Further reading

 
 
 

Parasitic wasps
Insects described in 1868